In mathematics, enumerative geometry is the branch of algebraic geometry concerned with counting numbers of solutions to geometric questions, mainly by means of intersection theory.

History

The problem of Apollonius is one of the earliest examples of enumerative geometry.  This problem asks for the number and construction of circles that are tangent to three given circles, points or lines.  In general, the problem for three given circles has eight solutions, which can be seen as 23, each tangency condition imposing a quadratic condition on the space of circles.  However, for special arrangements of the given circles, the number of solutions may also be any integer from 0 (no solutions) to six; there is no arrangement for which there are seven solutions to Apollonius' problem.

Key tools

A number of tools, ranging from the elementary to the more advanced, include:
 Dimension counting
 Bézout's theorem
 Schubert calculus, and more generally characteristic classes in cohomology
 The connection of counting intersections with cohomology is Poincaré duality
 The study of moduli spaces of curves, maps and other geometric objects, sometimes via the theory of quantum cohomology. The study of quantum cohomology, Gromov–Witten invariants and mirror symmetry gave a significant progress in Clemens conjecture.

Enumerative geometry is very closely tied to intersection theory.

Schubert calculus
Enumerative geometry saw spectacular development towards the end of the nineteenth century, at the hands of Hermann Schubert. He introduced for the purpose the Schubert calculus, which has proved of fundamental geometrical and topological value in broader areas. The specific needs of enumerative geometry were not addressed until some further attention was paid to them in the 1960s and 1970s (as pointed out for example by Steven Kleiman). Intersection numbers had been rigorously defined (by André Weil as part of his foundational programme 1942–6, and again subsequently), but this did not exhaust the proper domain of enumerative questions.

Fudge factors and Hilbert's fifteenth problem
Naïve application of dimension counting and Bézout's theorem yields incorrect results, as the following example shows. In response to these problems, algebraic geometers introduced vague "fudge factors", which were only rigorously justified decades later.

As an example, count the conic sections tangent to five given lines in the projective plane. The conics constitute a projective space of dimension 5, taking their six coefficients as homogeneous coordinates, and five points determine a conic, if the points are in general linear position, as passing through a given point imposes a linear condition. Similarly, tangency to a given line L (tangency is intersection with multiplicity two) is one quadratic condition, so determined a quadric in P5. However the linear system of divisors consisting of all such quadrics is not without a base locus. In fact each such quadric contains the Veronese surface, which parametrizes the conics

(aX + bY + cZ)2 = 0

called 'double lines'. This is because a double line intersects every line in the plane, since lines in the projective plane intersect, with multiplicity two because it is doubled, and thus satisfies the same intersection condition (intersection of multiplicity two) as a nondegenerate conic that is tangent to the line.

The general Bézout theorem says 5 general quadrics in 5-space will intersect in 32 = 25 points. But the relevant quadrics here are not in general position. From 32, 31 must be subtracted and attributed to the Veronese, to leave the correct answer (from the point of view of geometry), namely 1. This process of attributing intersections to 'degenerate' cases is a typical geometric introduction of a 'fudge factor'.

Hilbert's fifteenth problem was to overcome the apparently arbitrary nature of these interventions; this aspect goes beyond the foundational question of the Schubert calculus itself.

Clemens conjecture

In 1984 H. Clemens studied the counting of the number of rational curves on a quintic threefold  and reached the following conjecture.

This conjecture has been resolved in the case , but is still open for higher .

Examples

Some of the historically important examples of enumerations in algebraic geometry include: 

2  The number of lines meeting 4 general lines in space
8   The number of circles tangent to 3 general circles (the problem of Apollonius).
27   The number of lines on a smooth cubic surface (Salmon and Cayley)
2875  The number of lines on a general quintic threefold
3264  The number of conics tangent to 5 plane conics in general position (Chasles)
609250   The number of conics on a general quintic threefold
4407296 The number of conics tangent to 8 general quadric surfaces 
666841088  The number of quadric surfaces tangent to 9 given quadric surfaces in general position in 3-space  
5819539783680 The number of twisted cubic curves tangent to 12  given quadric surfaces in general position in 3-space

References

External links

Intersection theory
Algebraic geometry